KCGL (104.1 FM, "The Eagle") is a radio station broadcasting a classic hits format. It is licensed to Powell, Wyoming, and serves the entire Cody area. The station is currently owned by the Big Horn Radio Network, a division of Legend Communications of Wyoming, and features programming from Westwood One. The Eagle changed their format from classic rock to classic hits on July 15, 2016, at 3:00 p.m.

All five stations of the Big Horn Radio Network have their offices and studios located on Mountain View Drive in Cody. KCGL and KTAG share a transmitter site on Cedar Mountain off Highway 14, west of Cody.

History
The station was assigned call sign KRYV on April 16, 2001. On May 21, 2001, the station changed its call sign to the current KCGL.

References

External links

CGL
Classic hits radio stations in the United States
Radio stations established in 2001
2001 establishments in the United States
2001 establishments in Wyoming
Powell, Wyoming